The 2020–21 ISU Speed Skating World Cup, officially the ISU World Cup Speed Skating 2020–2021, was a series of two international speed skating competitions that ran in January 2021.

Calendar
The detailed schedule for the season.

Men's standings

500 m
Final classification

1000 m
Final classification

1500 m
Final classification

Long distances
Final classification

Mass start
Final classification

Team pursuit
Final classification

Women's standings

500 m
Final classification

1000 m
Final classification

1500 m
Final classification

Long distances
Final classification

Mass start
Final classification

Team pursuit
Final classification

References

External links
 ISU World Cup Speed Skating website

 
20-21
Isu Speed Skating World Cup, 2020-21